The blotch-necked moray eel (Gymnothorax margaritophorus) is a moray eel found in coral reefs in the Pacific and Indian Oceans. It was first named by Pieter Bleeker in 1864, and is also commonly known as the blackpearl moray, pearly moray, pearly reef-eel, or the trunk-eyed moray.

References

margaritophorus
Fish described in 1864